Neil Somerville (born 15 May 1973) is an Ulster Unionist Party (UUP) politician in Northern Ireland who was a Member of the Northern Ireland Assembly (MLA) for Fermanagh and South Tyrone between 2015 and 2016, having succeeded Tom Elliott in June 2015, following the latter's election to Westminster.

He resigned due to ill health in January 2016.

References

External links

1973 births
Living people
Northern Ireland MLAs 2011–2016
Ulster Unionist Party MLAs
People from County Tyrone